Tranquility or tranquillity is state of being calm, serene, and worry-free.

Tranquility or tranquillity may also refer to:

Places
Tranquillity, California, U.S.
Tranquility, New Jersey, U.S.
Tranquility, Ohio, U.S.
Tranquility Base, where Apollo 11 landed on the moon
Tranquillity Park, Downtown Houston, Texas, U.S.
Tranquillity Valley, Pensacola Mountains, Antarctica

Other uses
tranquility (video game)
Tranquility (ISS module), a module of the International Space Station
Tranquility (Lee Konitz album), 1957
Tranquility (Ahmad Jamal album), 1968
Tranquility (yacht), a superyacht
, a U.S. Navy hospital ship
Tranquility (novel), a 2001 novel by Attila Bartis

See also

Tranquil (disambiguation)
Sea of Tranquility (disambiguation)